Events from the year 1685 in Sweden

Incumbents
 Monarch – Charles XI

Events

 Jews are formally banned from residing in Sweden. As there is no Jewish minority in Sweden, the ban is in effect a ban against Jewish immigration.
 The postal service are now finally, in practice, available in all the nation.
 Guds Werk och Hwila by Haquin Spegel
 The Sami religion, which is still openly practiced, is officially outlawed and all evidence of such practice is liable to an arrest, which results in the final forced official conversion of the Sami people to Christianity.

Births

 7 January – Jonas Alströmer, pioneer and agriculture and industry (died 1761) 
 22 July – Henrik Magnus von Buddenbrock, baron (died 1743)
 6 December – George Bogislaus Staël von Holstein, baron and field marshal (died 1763)

Deaths

 24 September - Gustaf Otto Stenbock, politician and military  (born 1614)

References

 
Years of the 17th century in Sweden
Sweden